Tanya Mars (born 1948) is a performance and video artist based in Toronto, Ontario, Canada.

Biography
Mars was born in Monroe, Michigan in 1948, and has lived in Canada since 1967. She was married once, and has one daughter. Mars is also known as Tanya Rosenberg.

She was educated at the University of Michigan, Ann Arbor, Sir George Williams University in Montreal, and at Loyola College, Montreal (now incorporated into Concordia University).

Mars currently teaches performance art and video in the Department of Arts, Culture and Media in the University of Toronto Scarborough and is part of the graduate faculty of the Master of Visual Studies Program at the University of Toronto.

Work
Tanya Mars has been an active member of the Canadian arts scene, creating performance art and video works since 1974. She has performed widely across Canada, in Valparaiso, Chile, Mexico City, Sweden, France and Helsinki. Her work draws on feminist discourse and imagery, and often uses humour and satire.

Mars is a founding member of and director of Powerhouse Galleries (La Centrale) in Montreal, the first women's art gallery in Canada. She was the editor of Parallelogramme magazine from 1977–1989, and very active in The Association of National Non-Profit Artist-run Centres for 15 years. During the 1970s and 1980s, Mars was a member and secretary of The Association of National Non-Profit Artist-Run Centres, a national lobby group for artist-run centres (1976-1989). She is a past president and member of FADO, a non-profit artist-run centre for performance art based in Toronto, Canada. Currently, she is also a member of the 7a*11d Collective that produces a bi-annual International Festival of Performance Art in Toronto.

Tyranny of Bliss took place in 2004 in Toronto which had audiences travel by car to 14 tableaux representing the seven heavenly virtues and seven deadly sins.

With Johanna Householder, Mars co-edited the 2004 anthology Caught in the Act: An Anthology of Performance Art by Canadian Women. A second volume, also co-edited by Mars and Householder, entitled More Caught in the Act: An Anthology of Performance Art by Canadian Women was published in 2016.

Mars' performance work received in-depth treatment in a 2008 critical anthology edited by Paul Couillard.

Videography 
 The Granny Suites, Part 1: Happy Birthday to You - 2006
 7 Deadly Sins/ 7 Deadly Virtues - 2004
 Hot!  - 1998
 Doom - 1996
 Bronco's Kiss - 1996
 Mz. Frankenstein - 1993
 End of Nature, The - 1991
 PURE HELL - 1990
 Pure Sin - 1990
 Pure Nonsense - 1987
 Pure Sin - 1986
 Pure Virtue - 1985
 24 Postcards of Rage: No Man's Land - 1983 (with Rina Fraticelli)
 Picnic In The Drift - 1981

Performance Art
Good Buy!, 2018
Crone, 2017 (FADO, part of MonoMyths curated by Shannon Cochrane and Jess Dobkin)
Homage to the City of Women: Leaves of Gold, 2016 
Rare Parity, 2015
The Artist is A Present, 2015
Vanitas for an Arctic Landscape, 2015
Tyranny of Bliss, 2004
 Performance Art Starter Kit, 2000
Pure Virtue, 1984
Pure Sin, 1987
Pure Nonsense, 1987
Pure Hell, 1990
 Fat - 1978 (Thirteen Jackies)
 All Alone Am I - 1977 (Thirteen Jackies)
 Super Secretary - 1977
 Tanya-in-the-Box - 1976
 Codpieces: phallic paraphernalia - 1974

Awards
 2008 - Awarded Governor General's Award in Visual and Media Arts.
 2005 - Awarded "Artist of the Year," Untitled Arts Awards, Toronto.
 1981 - Received Chalmers Award for innovative collaboration in the performing arts for Picnic in the Drift with Rina Fraticelli.

Residencies 
 2008 - [https://www.citedesartsparis.net/ The Cité internationale des arts in Paris, International Artist in Residence.
 2008 - Lilith Performance Studio in Malmö, Sweden. Presented In Dulci Jubilo curated by Elin Lundgren and Petter Pettersson.
 1993 - Western Front in Vancouver, British Columbia. Presented Mz Frankenstein with Judy Radul and Brice Canyon as part of six-week residency, curated by Kate Craig.
 1984 - Western Front in Vancouver, British Columbia. Presented Pure Virtue.

References

External links 
 

1948 births
Living people
American performance artists
American expatriates in Canada
American video artists
American women artists
Artists from Michigan
Artists from Toronto
Canadian performance artists
Women performance artists
Canadian video artists
Women video artists
Canadian women artists
Governor General's Award in Visual and Media Arts winners
People from Monroe, Michigan
University of Michigan alumni